Christian Acella (born 7 July 2002) is an Italian football player. He plays as a central midfielder for  club Cremonese.

Career
Acellas was raised in the youth system of Cagliari and then Cremonese.

On 20 July 2021, Acella joined Giana Erminio in Serie C on a season-long loan. He made his senior debut at the club and played most of the season as the starter.

Upon his return from loan, Acella made his debut for the senior squad of Cremonese on 8 August 2022 in a Coppa Italia game against Ternana. He made his Serie A debut for the club on 12 February 2023 against Napoli.

References

External links
 

2002 births
Footballers from Milan
Living people
Italian footballers
Association football midfielders
A.S. Giana Erminio players
U.S. Cremonese players
Serie A players
Serie C players